Claire Nielson (née Isbister; born 8 April 1937) is a Scottish actress primarily known for her television roles. On television, she played the wife of the belligerent American guest, Mr. Hamilton, in the "Waldorf Salad" episode of Fawlty Towers, appeared as Jean 'Porridge' Carter, Geoffrey Stock's secretary, in the popular 1960s crime series Ghost Squad and played the wife of Rikki Fulton's character in many sketches of the Scottish Hogmanay show Scotch and Wry from 1978 until 1993. Other TV credits include Upstairs, Downstairs, Monarch of the Glen, The Brothers, The Two Ronnies, Take The High Road, Z-Cars, Special Branch, Thriller and Taggart. She also appeared as Barbara Grant in the 1971 film version of Kidnapped, opposite Michael Caine and Trevor Howard.

References

External links

1937 births
Living people
Scottish television actresses
Place of birth missing (living people)